Mary Turner may refer to:
Mary Turner (lynching victim) (1899–1918), African-American victim of lynching in Valdosta, Georgia
Mary Turner (trade unionist) (1938–2017), Irish trade unionist
Mary Turner Cook, wife of Australian Prime Minister Joseph Cook
Mary Lou Turner (born 1947), American country music artist
Mary Elizabeth Turner (1854–1907), English embroiderer
Mary Elizabeth Turner Salter (1856–1938), American soprano and composer
Mary Kathleen Turner (born 1954), American actress and director
Mary Dawson Turner (1774–1850), English artist
Mary Turner (businesswoman) (born 1958), CEO of Koovs